Jennifer "Jenny" Lee Fish (born May 17, 1949) is an American speed skater who competed in the 1968 Winter Olympics.

Early life 

She was born in Strongsville, Ohio.

Early career 

Fish began seeing success at the age of 12 in 1961, when she won the Ohio indoor championship and the Cleveland Press Silver Skates Midget-Novice title. From there, he success grew, and by 1964 she won the National indoor and outdoor junior championships and the U.S National indoor and outdoor titles.

Fish held eight separate U.S. national speed skating records throughout her career.

Olympic career 

At the age of 18, Fish qualified for the 1968 Winter Olympics despite limited international experience. However, she won the silver medal in the 500 metres event, finishing in a three-way tie with two other American skaters. In the 1000 metres competition she finished 23rd.

Personal Bests

Life After Skating 

Following her speed skating career, Fish went on to earn a degree in health and physical education from Baldwin-Wallace College and a master's in education from Kent State University.

References 

1949 births
Living people
Speed skaters at the 1968 Winter Olympics
Olympic silver medalists for the United States in speed skating
American female speed skaters
People from Strongsville, Ohio
Medalists at the 1968 Winter Olympics
21st-century American women